Kishwaukee College is a public community college in Malta, Illinois.  It is part of the Illinois Community College System and serves District 523, which encompasses most of DeKalb County, and parts of Lee, Ogle and La Salle counties.

History 
The college was founded in 1968. Dr. W. Lamar Fly was selected as the college's first president as work began to construct the initial buildings on campus. Over the next several decades, the college continued to grow and adapt to the changing needs of the community, by adding sports facilities, a greenhouse, the Early Childhood Education Center, new science and health technologies, a therapeutic massage clinic, and more. In 2011, voters approved a referendum to expand Kish's campus by updating the current facilities, constructing a new student center and adding parking. In 2015, Dr. Laurie Borowicz was named as the fifth president and the first female president in Kishwaukee College's history and began her term in 2016.

Kishwaukee College's campus is also host to a historical marker for the first seedling mile of the cross-country Lincoln Highway, which was constructed in 1914.

Campus 
The 120-acre campus is rural in nature and is surrounded on all four sides by farm fields. Along with its vast educational resources, Kish's campus is home to a athletic fields, greenhouse facilities, a conference center, the Early Learning Center, and the Kishwaukee Education Consortium.

Academic profile 
The college is fully accredited by the Higher Learning Commission and has received a reaffirmation of accreditation through 2028. Kishwaukee College has also received recognition and accreditation through the Illinois Community College Board and Illinois Board of Higher Education.

Additional accreditations include:

 ACEN Nursing Accreditation
 Joint Review Committee on Education in Radiological Technology
 National Automotive Technicians Education Foundation
 Illinois Department of Financial and Professional Regulation
 National College Testing Association Test Center
 National Accreditation Commission for Early Learning Leaders
 American Welding Society
 Commission on Accreditation of Allied Health Education Programs
 Committee on Accreditation of Educational Programs for the Emergency Medical Services Professions

The college has an enrollment of 3,842  The tuition cost for in-district students is $147 per credit hour.

Student life 
Kishwaukee College is home to dozens of student clubs and organizations covering interests like dance, gaming, horticulture, government, leadership and more. The college also houses an art gallery, a theatre, an art collection and various arts and culture events throughout the year. Each spring, Kishwaukee College publishes the Kamelian, a literary and arts magazine. The Kamelian, first published in 1968, is the only Illinois literary arts magazine to have won three awards in the Community College Humanities Association National Literary Magazine Competition since 2000.

Athletics 
The Kishwaukee College mascot is the Kougars. The Kougars compete in 14 men's and women's sports through the National Junior College Athletic Association. Kish competes in the NJCAA's Region 4 and in the Arrowhead Athletic Conference. The Kougars have won national championships in baseball (1999) and volleyball (2001, 2002, 2006, 2007, 2008).

Men's Teams

 Baseball
 Basketball
 Bowling 
 Cross Country
 Golf
 Soccer

Women's Teams

 Basketball
 Bowling 
 Cross Country
 Golf
 Soccer
 Softball 
 Volleyball

Co-Ed Teams

 Esports

Notable people 

Lou Collier played baseball for the Pittsburgh Pirates among others.

References

External links
Official website

 
Buildings and structures in DeKalb County, Illinois
Community colleges in Illinois
Education in DeKalb County, Illinois
NJCAA athletics
Educational institutions established in 1968
1968 establishments in Illinois